Gynecologic cytology, also gynecologic cytology, is a field of pathology concerned with the investigation of disorders of the female genital tract.  

The most common investigation in this field is the Pap test, which is used to screen for potentially precancerous lesions of the cervix.  Cytology can also be used to investigate disorders of the ovaries, uterus, vagina and vulva.

Gynaecology
Cytopathology
Pathology